The 1992–93 NSL Cup was the 17th season of the National Soccer League Cup. Adelaide City were the holders, having beaten Marconi Fairfield in the 1992 NSL Cup Final. They were eliminated by Heidelberg United in the semi-finals. Heidelberg United beat Parramatta Eagles in the Final to win their 1st NSL Cup overall.

Teams
The NSL Cup is a knockout competition with 14 teams taking part all trying to reach the Final in April 1993. The competitors consist of the 14 teams from the National Soccer League.

First round
 First leg

 Second leg

Second round
 First leg

 Second leg

Semi-finals

Final

Top scorers

References

NSL Cup seasons
NSL Cup